Live Till You Die is a compilation album by Today Is the Day, released on August 29, 2000 through Relapse Records. It collects various unreleased studio, live, and demo tracks. 

"Feel Like Makin' Love", "Wicked Game", and "Why Don't We Do It in the Road?" are covers of songs originally from Bad Company, Chris Isaak, and The Beatles, respectively.

Track listing

Release history

Personnel 
Today Is the Day
Steve Austin – vocals, guitar, production, engineering, mixing, recording, mastering
Brann Dailor – drums (tracks 1–3, 5, 8, 9, 13–15)
Bill Kelliher – bass guitar (tracks 1–3, 5, 8, 9, 13–15)
Christopher Reeser – bass guitar, sampler (tracks 4, 6, 12)
Mike Hyde – drums, percussion (tracks 4, 12)
Brad Elrod - drums (track 6)

References

External links 
 
 Live Till You Die at Bandcamp

2000 compilation albums
Relapse Records compilation albums
Today Is the Day albums